The Woman in Red Boots is a 1974 fantasy comedy-drama film co-written and directed by Juan Luis Buñuel. The film stars Catherine Deneuve as a beautiful young writer with the power to make her wishes reality whose life becomes entangled with the plots of the wealthy art patron Perrot, played by Fernando Rey. The film is highly surrealistic and tinged with a meta-narrative, with the characters roughly representing divisions of the art world: the raw creative power of young Françoise, the heroine who has nearly unlimited potential; the cynical manipulation and distant intellectualism of the elder Perrot; and the middle-aged Marc (Adalberto Maria Merli), trapped in the middle and forced to choose.

Plot
Françoise Leroy is a young and beautiful novelist with the extraordinary ability to make her wishes come true. She starts the film in a relationship with Richard, a bohemian painter. Perrot, an older wealthy art lover who is fascinated by the destruction of works, decides to meddle with Françoise and Richard. Perrot causes Françoise and Marc, a publisher, to meet; the two begin trading reality-altering letters, much to the concern of Sophie, Marc's wife. Sophie, while attempting to spy on Marc's hunting trip to understand what is going on with this potential affair, is shot by her husband in an accident, possibly caused by Françoise's unconscious desire for Marc to be available. Perrot invites Françoise to settle in his house to write there, then invites both Marc, Richard, and various other artists as well. Perrot's machinations are tied somewhat to his love of chess which manifests in a three-dimensional chess game he is playing (both in reality and his subjective actions). Perrot arranges the "Death of art" in a mass suicide of the artists, as art requires destruction to be complete in his opinion; Richard and Marc draw straws to see who can stay with Françoise. Marc loses; Françoise and Richard escape through one of Richard's paintings that opens up to allow them to physically walk inside to the world within, yet turns back to paint when another person inspects the picture.

Cast
 Catherine Deneuve as Françoise
 Fernando Rey as Perrot
 Jacques Weber as Richard
 Adalberto Maria Merli as Marc
 José Sacristán as Cleber, Perrot's valet
 Emma Cohen as Sophie, Marc's wife
 Laura Betti as Léonore

References

External links
 
 
 

1974 films
1974 comedy-drama films
1970s fantasy comedy-drama films
1970s French films
1970s French-language films
1970s Italian films
1970s Spanish films
Films about writers
French fantasy comedy-drama films
French-language Italian films
Italian fantasy comedy-drama films
Spanish comedy-drama films
Spanish fantasy comedy films
Spanish fantasy drama films